James Ward Brady (May 28, 1881 – August 21, 1947) was a starting pitcher in Major League Baseball who played between  and . Brady batted and threw right-handed.

In 1881, King Brady was born in Elmer, New Jersey. A modest pitcher most of his career, Brady was 24 years old when he reached the majors in 1905 with the Philadelphia Phillies, spending one year with them before moving to the Pittsburgh Pirates (1906–1907), Boston Red Sox (1908) and Boston Braves (1912). His most productive season came in 1906 with Pittsburgh, when he finished 1-1 and compiled career-highs in ERA (2.35), strikeouts (14) and innings pitched (23.0). On October 5, 1908, with the Red Sox, he made his only American League appearance a good one, pitching an eight-hit, 4–0 shutout over the New York Highlanders.

External links

Baseball Library
Retrosheet

1881 births
1947 deaths
People from Elmer, New Jersey
Boston Braves players
Boston Red Sox players
Philadelphia Phillies players
Pittsburgh Pirates players
Major League Baseball pitchers
Little Rock Travelers players
Johnstown Johnnies players
Newark Indians players
Wilkes-Barre Barons (baseball) players
Albany Senators players
Atlanta Crackers players
Scranton Miners players
Elmira Colonels players
Baseball players from New Jersey
Sportspeople from Salem County, New Jersey
Burials at Albany Rural Cemetery